Kevin McManamon (born 9 December 1986) is a Gaelic footballer from Dublin who plays for the St Jude's club and was a senior member of the Dublin county team since 2010. He retired in December 2021.

McManamon made his senior debut in O'Byrne Cup against Wexford. In 2010 during the league he was selected as one of the top young players as well being part of the Under 21 Dublin team that won the All-Ireland Under 21 Football Championship.

In the 2011 All-Ireland Senior Football Championship, McManamon played a significant role in the semi final and final.  In the semi final against Donegal, he came as a substitute with 20 minutes left in the match and scored a vital point.

In the final, he also came on with 20 minutes to go and scored a goal to reduce the margin between the teams at the time from 4 points to a single point.  Dublin went on to win the match by a single point and the Irish Independent named him as their man of the match.

As his career begun to wind down, Kevin developed a strong interest in Sports Psychology and has worked with such organisations as the winning Templeogue Basketball team and the Irish Amateur Boxing Team.

One of Kevin's favourite films is Independence Day released in 1996, Kevin's favourite character is the much maligned Russell Casse, it is believed that as Kevin approached the Kerry Goal in 2011 for his famous goal, he drew strength from when Russell's missile jammed approaching the alien's mothership and in a selfless moment sacrificed himself for the cause of humanity. 

On December 1, 2021, in a statement released by Dublin GAA, McManamon announced his immediate retirement from inter-county Football.

Honours
Dublin
All-Ireland Senior Football Championship (8): 2011, 2013, 2015, 2016, 2017, 2018, 2019, 2020
Leinster Senior Football Championship (10): 2011, 2012, 2013, 2014, 2015, 2016, 2017, 2018, 2019, 2020
 National Football League (5): 2013, 2014, 2015, 2016, 2018
 O'Byrne Cup (1): 2015

References

1986 births
Living people
Dublin inter-county Gaelic footballers
Gaelic football forwards
Sports psychologists
St Jude's Gaelic footballers
Winners of eight All-Ireland medals (Gaelic football)